Captive is a 1986 Anglo-French cinema film loosely based on the experiences of Patty Hearst.

Plot
Gregory Le Vay is a wealthy business man whose daughter, Rowena is kidnapped by a terrorist group. Through manipulation psychologically she is subordinated by them and led from the cultural and emotional imprisonment of her former life to the liberation of theirs.

Cast
 Irina Brook as Rowena Le Vay
 Oliver Reed as Gregory Le Vay

Soundtrack
The soundtrack was provided by Michael Berkeley, the Edge and Michael Brook working with Sinéad O'Connor.

References

External links

1986 films
British drama films
Films with screenplays by Paul Mayersberg
Films about kidnapping
Films directed by Paul Mayersberg
1980s English-language films
1980s British films